Zesshō may refer to:

 Zesshō (1958 film), a 1958 black-and-white Japanese film directed by Eisuke Takizawa

 Zesshō (1975 film)